Priacanthus sagittarius, The arrow bulleye, is a species of marine ray finned fish, a bigeye in the family Priacanthidae. It is native to the Indian and Pacific Oceans. It is also observed since 2009, in rare occasions, in the eastern Mediterranean Sea, which it most likely entered via the Suez Canal.

References

Fish of Thailand
Fish of Australia
Fish described in 1988
Fish of the Pacific Ocean
Fish of the Indian Ocean
sagittarius